Étienne Jacques-Joseph-Alexandre Macdonald, 1st Duke of Taranto (17 November 176525 September 1840), was a Marshal of the Empire and military leader during the French Revolutionary and Napoleonic Wars.

Family background
Étienne Jacques Joseph Alexandre Macdonald was born in Sedan, Ardennes, France. His father, Neil MacEachen, later MacDonald, came from a Jacobite family from Howbeg in South Uist, in the West of Scotland. He was a close relative of Flora MacDonald, who played a key role in the escape of Prince Charles Edward Stuart after the failure of the 1745 Rising.

Military life
In 1784, Macdonald joined the Irish Legion, raised to support the revolutionary party in the Dutch Republic against the Kingdom of Prussia and was made lieutenant on 1 April 1785. After it was disbanded, he received a commission in Dillon's Regiment. At the start of the French Revolution, the regiment of Dillon remained loyal to the King, except for Macdonald, who was in love with Mlle Jacob, whose father was an enthusiastic revolutionary. After his marriage on May 5, 1791, on 17 August 1792, he was promoted to captain, and on 29 August 1792 he was appointed aide-de-camp to General Charles François Dumouriez. He distinguished himself at the Battle of Jemappes, and was promoted to lieutenant colonel on 12 November 1792 and then colonel on 8 March 1793.

He refused to desert to the Austrians with Dumouriez and as a reward was made général de brigade on 26 August 1793 and appointed to command the leading brigade in Pichegru's invasion of the Netherlands. His knowledge of the country proved useful, and he was instrumental in the capture of the Dutch fleet by French hussars in January 1795.

In 1797, having been made général de division back in November 1794, he now served first in the Army of the Rhine and later in the Army of Italy as of 24 April 1798.

When he reached Italy in 1798, the Treaty of Campo Formio had been signed on 18 October 1797, and Bonaparte had returned to France; but, under the direction of Berthier, Macdonald occupied Rome in the 1798-1799 Roman Republic, of which he was made governor on 19 November 1798, and then in conjunction with Championnet he defeated General Mack at the Battle of Ferentino, the Battle of Otricoli, the 5 December 1798 Battle of Civita Castellana, and two military affairs, first at Calvi Risorta and then on 3 January 1799 at Capua, and then by 10 January 1799, he had resigned his Office due to disagreements with Championnet. However, despite any differences, the men managed to conquer the 1282-1799 Kingdom of Naples, which then became known as the Parthenopaean Republic.

Russian General Suvorov invaded northern Italy in March 1799 with an Austro-Russian army, and was undoing the conquests of Bonaparte and defeated Moreau at Cassano and San Giuliano. In response Macdonald moved northwards in command of the Armée de Naples. With 36,000 men, he attacked Suvorov's 22,000 men at the Trebbia. After three days' fighting, receiving no help from Moreau, he was utterly defeated and retreated to Genoa. Later, he was made governor of Versailles and acquiesced, even if he did not participate, in the events of the 18 Brumaire.

In 1800, he received command of the army in the Helvetic Republic, maintaining communications between the armies of Germany and of Italy. He carried out his orders diligently, and in the winter of 1800–01, he was ordered to march over the Splügen Pass at the head of the Army of the Grisons. This achievement is described by Mathieu Dumas, his chief of staff. It is sometimes considered as noteworthy as Bonaparte's passage of the St Bernard before the Battle of Marengo, although Macdonald did not fight a battle.

On his return to Paris, Macdonald married the widow of General Joubert, and was appointed French ambassador to Denmark. Returning in 1805, he was associated with Moreau and thus incurred the dislike of Napoleon, who did not include him in his first creation of marshals. It was for the same reason that Napoleon did not give him a military command between 1803 and 1809.

Under Napoleon

He remained without employment until 1809, but then Napoleon made him military adviser to Prince Eugène de Beauharnais, viceroy of the Kingdom of Italy and the commander of the Army of Italy. After meeting an unexpected defeat at Aspern-Essling, Napoleon summoned Eugène's army north to join him, with Macdonald in tow. On the second day of Wagram, amid great pressure along the entire front, Napoleon ordered Macdonald to launch a desperate counterattack on the enemy centre. Macdonald promptly organised a gigantic three-sided open-backed infantry square, covered by Nansouty's cavalry, and hurled it against the Austrian lines. Despite sustaining terrible casualties from the Austrian artillery, this bold attack broke the Austrian centre and won the day.

After the battle, having rushed to find him on the corpse-strewn battlefield, Napoleon told Macdonald, "You have behaved valiantly...On the battlefield of your glory, where I owe you so large a part of yesterday's success, I make you a Marshal of France. You have long deserved it." Additionally, Napoleon soon after ennobled him Duke of Taranto in the Kingdom of Naples.

In 1810, Macdonald served in Spain and in 1812, he commanded the left wing of the Grande Armée for the invasion of Russia. He was sent to the north but did not succeed in occupying Riga. In 1813, after participating in the battles of Lützen and Bautzen, he was ordered to invade Silesia, where Blücher defeated him with great loss at Katzbach. At the Battle of Nations in 1813, his force was pushed out at  Liebertwolkwitz by Johann von Klenau's IV Corps (Austrian); on a counterattack, his troops took the village back.  Later that day, Klenau foiled his attempt to flank the Austrian main army, commanded by Karl Philipp, Prince of Schwarzenberg.  After the Battle of Leipzig, he was ordered to cover the evacuation of Leipzig with Prince Poniatowski.  After the blowing up of the last bridge over the river, he managed to swim the Elster, but Poniatowski drowned. During the defensive campaign of 1814, Macdonald again distinguished himself. He was one of the marshals sent by Napoleon to take the notice of his abdication to Paris. When all were deserting Napoleon, Macdonald remained faithful. He was directed by Napoleon to give his adherence to the new régime, and was presented with the sabre of Murad Bey for his fidelity.

Under the Bourbons

At the Restoration, he was made a peer of France and knight grand cross of the royal order of St. Louis; he remained faithful to the new order during the Hundred Days. In 1815, he became chancellor of the Legion of Honour, a post he held till 1831. In 1816, as major-general of the royal bodyguard, he took part in the debates of the Chamber of Peers, created under the Charter of 1814, voting consistently as a moderate Liberal. After Napoleon's abdication in 1814 Treaty of Fontainebleau (1814), Macdonald continued serving under the Bourbon monarchy. Known for speaking his mind, and never shying away from sharing his opinions, King Louis XVIII gave him the nickname "His Outspokenness".

From 1830, he lived in retirement at his country home, the Chateau de Courcelles-le-Roy in Beaulieu-sur-Loire commune, Loiret, where he died on 25 September 1840, aged 74.

Personal life
In 1791, he married Marie-Constance Soral de Montloisir (died 1797) and had 2 daughters:
 Anne-Charlotte Macdonald (1792–1870)
 Adele-Elisabeth Macdonald (1794–1822)

In 1802, he married Felicité-Françoise de Montholon (1780–1804), the widow of General Joubert, and had a daughter:
 Alexandrine-Aimee Macdonald (1803–1869)

In 1821, he married Ernestine-Therese de Bourgoing (1789–1825) and had a son:
 Louis-Marie Macdonald, 2nd Duke of Taranto (1824–1881)

Scottish legacy
On 30 April 2010, a plaque was unveiled to the memory of Marshal of France Jacques Macdonald on the Outer Hebridean island of South Uist, the familial home of Macdonald.  Macdonald had visited South Uist in 1825 in order to find out more about his family roots.

Assessment
Macdonald was assessed in the Encyclopædia Britannica of 1911, which argued:

Macdonald had none of that military genius that distinguished Davout, Masséna and Lannes, nor of that military science conspicuous in Marmont and St Cyr, but nevertheless his campaign in Switzerland gives him a rank far superior to such mere generals of division as Oudinot and Dupont. This capacity for independent command made Napoleon, in spite of his defeats at the Trebia and the Battle of Katzbach, trust him with large commands till the end of his career. As a man, his character cannot be spoken of too highly; no stain of cruelty or faithlessness rests on him.Military historian Gunter E. Rothenberg wrote that although he overstated his own abilities, Macdonald was an excellent commander. Richard Dunn-Pattison praised Macdonald for his "keen military insight" while A. G. MacDonell called his career a string of defeats. John M. Keefe blamed his defeat at Katzbach on a general lack of staff officers in French armies not commanded by Napoleon, arguing that Macdonald had fought successfully in the rest of his career.

Notes

References
 Clausewitz, Carl von (2020). Napoleon Absent, Coalition Ascendant: The 1799 Campaign in Italy and Switzerland, Volume 1. Trans and ed. Nicholas Murray and Christopher Pringle. Lawrence, Kansas: University Press of Kansas. 
 Clausewitz, Carl von (2021). The Coalition Crumbles, Napoleon Returns: The 1799 Campaign in Italy and Switzerland, Volume 2. Trans and ed. Nicholas Murray and Christopher Pringle. Lawrence, Kansas: University Press of Kansas. 
 Heraldica.org – Napoleonic heraldry
Macdonald was especially fortunate to have accounts of his military exploits recorded by Mathieu Dumas and Ségur who were on his staff in Switzerland.
 M.Dumas, Evénements militaires
 Ségur's rare tract, Lecture sur la campagne du Général Macdonald dans les Grisons en 1800 et 1801 (1802), and Eloge (1842).
 His memoirs were published in 1892 (Eng. trans., Recollections of Marshal Macdonald), but are brief and wanting in balance.
His diary of 1825 has been translated into English with a commentary ...
 The French MacDonald: Journey of a Marshal of Napoléon in the Highlands and Islands of Scotland; the 1825 travel diary of Jacques Etienne Joseph Alexandre Macdonald, with commentaries by Jean-Didier Hache and Domhnall Uilleam Stiùbhart. [Port of Ness, Isle of Lewis]: The Islands Book Trust, 2007  209p. 

1765 births
1840 deaths
French Freemasons
People from Sedan, Ardennes
Marshals of the First French Empire
Burials at Père Lachaise Cemetery
Dukes of Taranto
French people of Scottish descent
Grand Chanceliers of the Légion d'honneur
French generals
Military leaders of the French Revolutionary Wars
French Republican military leaders of the French Revolutionary Wars
Peers of France
State ministers of France
Roman Republic (18th century)
Names inscribed under the Arc de Triomphe